Ralph S. Hurst (February 18, 1917 – July 26, 1972) was an American set decorator. He was nominated for an Academy Award in the category Best Art Direction for the film Giant.

Selected filmography
 Giant (1956)

References

External links

American set decorators
1917 births
1972 deaths